The Mina language, also known by the names Hina and Besleri, is a Chadic language spoken in Northern Cameroon by 10,000 people. Speakers of Mina are generally bilingual, with Fulfulde (Fula) being the second language. Fulfulde is often joined by French as a third language in educated speakers.

Besleri is spoken in most of Hina commune (Mayo-Tsanaga Department, Far North Region), with Gamdugun and Jinjin in the southwest and southeast of the area, respectively.

Dialects
Frajzyngier & Johnston (2005) list three Mina dialects: Marbak, Kefedjevreng and Dzundzun. Ethnologue also lists three: Besleri, Jingjing (Dzumdzum), Gamdugun. While the correspondence of "Jingjing" and "Dzundzun" is clear, the identity of the others is not. Mutual intelligibility between dialects is difficult to ascertain, but Frajzyngier & Johnston (2005:3) demonstrate one-way intelligibility between Dzundzun and Mina (presumably meaning the Marbak dialect).

Notes

References
 Frajzyngier, Zygmunt & Johnston, Eric. (2005). A Grammar of Mina. Berlin: Mouton de Gruyter.
 Newman, Paul. (1992). "Chadic Languages." In: Bright, William. International Encyclopedia of Linguistics. Oxford: Oxford University Press.

Biu-Mandara languages
Languages of Cameroon